The Pakistan national women's cricket team travelled to the West Indies prior to the 2010 ICC Women's World Twenty20 to play three Twenty20 (T20) matches against the West Indies women's cricket team.

Twenty20 series

1st T20

2nd T20

3rd T20

References

Pakistan 2010
2010 in Saint Kitts and Nevis
Women 2010
West 2010
2010 in Pakistani cricket
2010 in West Indian cricket
2010 in women's cricket
2010 in Pakistani women's sport